Patty Weaver (born September 23, 1955) is an American actress who played the role of Gina Roma on The Young and the Restless on a contract basis from 1982 until August 2005, when she was dropped to recurring status; she last appeared in 2013.

Weaver was born in Clarksburg, West Virginia. Before her role on The Young and the Restless, Weaver played the role of Trish Clayton Banning on Days of Our Lives from 1976 to 1982.

Before launching her acting career, Patty formed the rock 'n roll band the Loved Ones. She has continued her singing career and has released several albums.

She began her acting career by guest-starring on television series, including Maude and All in the Family, before beginning her daytime acting career with a six-year stint on Days of Our Lives.  Weaver is active on the night club circuit, and has opened for Bob Newhart, Don Rickles, Jerry Lewis, and George Burns in Las Vegas and Atlantic City.

She was a regular on some of the most prominent telethons and has helped to raise millions of dollars for charities. Weaver lives in Southern California. She divorced her first husband, an attorney, when he became physically abusive to her, and a few years later, she married actor Gary Faga.  She was later married to former Y&R writer Jerry Birn from 1994 until his death in 2009.

Roles
The Young and the Restless - Gina Roma (1982–2009, 2013)
Days of Our Lives - Trish Clayton Banning (1976–1982)
Huckleberry Finn - Mary Jane (1975)
All in the Family (episode "Archie Goes Too Far") - Joanie (27 January 1973)

Patty Weaver also portrayed the nameless wife / mother in a non-speaking role as featured in the Twisted Sister music video "We're Not Gonna Take It".

Discography

Studio albums 

 Feelings (1976)
 Patty Weaver Sings 'As Time Goes By''' (1976)
 No One's Ever Seen This Side Of Me (1978) Patty Weaver (1982)
 Patty Weaver Sings Christmas: Country and City Favorites (1993)

 Singles 

 "Christmas Is..." b/w "''You're All I Want For Christmas" (1976)
 "Shot In The Dark" b/w "Line Of Fire" (1982)
 "Don't Want A Heartache (Edit)" b/w "Part Time Man" (1982)

References

External links 

Patty Weaver on Discogs

1953 births
Living people
Actors from Clarksburg, West Virginia
American soap opera actresses
Musicians from West Virginia
Actresses from West Virginia
21st-century American women